Achromobacter ruhlandii is a Gram-negative bacterium included in the order Burkholderiales.

External links
Type strain of Achromobacter ruhlandii at BacDive -  the Bacterial Diversity Metadatabase

Burkholderiales
Bacteria described in 1981